The Marsiling–Yew Tee Group Representation Constituency is a four-member Group Representation Constituency (GRC) in the north-western part of Singapore. The constituency encompasses Chua Chu Kang (Yew Tee), Sungei Kadut Industrial Area, Kranji, Woodlands Checkpoint, and the west part of Woodlands. The four divisions of the GRC: Limbang, Marsiling, Yew Tee and Woodgrove. The current Members of Parliament are Lawrence Wong, Alex Yam, Hany Soh and Zaqy Mohamad from the People's Action Party (PAP).

History 

On 7 August 2017, Halimah Yacob resigned as Member of Parliament (MP) and as Speaker of Parliament in order to contest in the 2017 Singapore presidential election, and elected as the 8th President of Singapore due to a walkover on the nomination day on 13 September 2017.

On 8 August 2017, Zaqy Mohamad, who is also an MP for Chua Chu Kang GRC, was appointed as grassroots advisor, before becoming MP for Marsiling 3 years later, under the government-linked People's Association, for Halimah's Marsiling ward. His appointment has caused controversy, as Halimah was the sole minority MP for Marsiling–Yew Tee GRC and a grassroots advisor is not the same as having an MP elected by residents of the constituency. While the government maintains that it is legal to forgo the calling of a by-election, one of the original purposes of the GRC system was to ensure minority representation. The High Court dismissed a bid by the Singapore Democratic Party assistant treasurer Wong Souk Yee for a by-election to be called. Justice Chua Lee Ming presided on the hearing. The appeal was subsequently dismissed by the Court of Appeal.

Members of Parliament

Yacob resigned her post on 7 August 2017 in order to contest in the 2017 Presidential Elections; However, no by-election was called on the ground since it was a Group Representation Constituency, and the ward was temporarily substituted by Zaqy Mohamad as grassroots adviser not MP, who was also the Chua Chu Kang GRC MP.

Electoral results

Elections in 2010s

Elections in 2020s

References

2015 establishments in Singapore
Singaporean electoral divisions
Choa Chu Kang
Sungei Kadut
Woodlands, Singapore
Kranji